Jan Christoph Westerhoff is a German philosopher and orientalist with specific interests in metaphysics and the philosophy of language. He is currently Professor of Buddhist Philosophy in the Faculty of Theology and Religion of the University of Oxford.

Early life and education
Westerhoff was educated at the Annette-von-Droste-Hülshoff Gymnasium, a Gymnasium in Düsseldorf, Germany. He studied philosophy at Trinity College, Cambridge, graduating with a first class Bachelor of Arts (BA) degree in 1999. He continued his studies of philosophy at Trinity and completed a Master of Philosophy (MPhil) degree in 2000. He undertook postgraduate research at the Faculty of Philosophy, University of Cambridge; his doctoral supervisor was Michael Potter. He completed his Doctor of Philosophy (PhD) degree in 2003, with a doctoral thesis titled "An inquiry into the notion of an ontological category". He undertook research for a second doctorate, this time in Oriental studies, at the School of Oriental and African Studies, University of London (SOAS). He completed his second PhD in 2007 with a doctoral thesis titled "Nagarjuna's madhyamaka: A philosophical investigation".

Academic career
He was previously a research fellow in philosophy at the City University of New York, a seminar associate at Columbia University, a junior research fellow at Linacre College, a junior lecturer in the philosophy of mathematics at the University of Oxford, a university lecturer in religious ethics at the University of Oxford, a Fellow of Lady Margaret Hall and a research associate at SOAS.

Research
He is a specialist in metaphysics and Indo-Tibetan philosophy. In particular, his research focuses on the philosophy of the early Indian Mahāyāna Buddhist thinker, Nāgārjuna, with comprehensive books such as Nagarjuna's Madhyamaka. His research interests also include the history of ideas in the sixteenth and seventeenth centuries. His most recent research interests focus on the history of solipsism.

Selected works

Books
The Non-Existence of the Real World. (Oxford University Press, 2020, 384 pp.)
Crushing the Categories: Nagarjuna's Vaidalyaprakarana. (Somerville, MA: Wisdom Publications, 2018)
The Golden Age of Indian Buddhist Philosophy. (Oxford: Oxford University Press, 2018)
Reality: A Very Short Introduction. (Oxford: Oxford University Press, 2011)
The Dispeller of Disputes: Nagarjuna's Vigrahavyavartani. (Oxford: Oxford University Press, 2010)
Twelve Examples of Illusion. (Oxford: Oxford University Press, 2010)
(co-authored with The Cowherds) Moonshadows: Conventional Truth in Buddhist Philosophy. (Oxford: Oxford University Press, 2010)
Nagarjuna's Madhyamaka. (Oxford: Oxford University Press, 2009)
Ontological Categories: Their Nature and Significance (Oxford: Oxford University Press, 2005)

Journal papers (selection)

Talks
Talk on naturalizing Buddhism, 2011
Talk at the Madhyamaka and Methodology Symposium, 2010

See also 
 Similarities between Pyrrhonism and Buddhism

References

External links
Westerhoff's homepage

Academics of Durham University
Fellows of Lady Margaret Hall, Oxford
German orientalists
Living people
Metaphysicians
Philosophers of language
Ontologists
21st-century German philosophers
German male non-fiction writers
Alumni of Trinity College, Cambridge
Year of birth missing (living people)